

Baker's Dozen Donut Corporation is a doughnut store operator in the Canadian province of Ontario. Its name is a reference to the term baker's dozen, meaning thirteen items (one item more than a regular dozen).

Overview
The company was founded in 1977 by Peter and Ted Paraskakis.

The chain operated over 100 stores, mostly in the Greater Toronto, Ontario area. Expansion came in the late 1980s, but it remained a small scale operation. Stores were chain-owned or franchised.

The 100th location opened late 1993.  At that time it was the 4th largest doughnut chain in Ontario, having grown 43% over the previous four years.

Advertisements 
The store has several slogans:
 "Not Just Donuts..."
 "You Always Get More In A Baker's Dozen!"

References

Doughnut shops
Fast-food chains of Canada
Retail companies established in 1977
Coffeehouses and cafés in Canada
Companies based in Mississauga